Iñaki Gomez Goroztieta (born January 16, 1988) is a Canadian retired race walker. He competed in the 20 kilometres walk event at the 2012 Summer Olympics, and finished in 13th place. More recently, he competed in the IAAF World Championships in Athletics in Moscow where he finished 8th place.

In university, Gomez won three NAIA 5000-metre race walk titles (2008-2010) as a member of the UBC Thunderbirds.

In July 2016, he was named to Canada's Olympic team.  At the Rio Olympics, he finished in 12th place.

He announced retirement the following year, on May 3, 2017. In March 2018 Gómez was elected the World Athletics member of Athlete's Commission.

Personal bests

Achievements

†: Guest appearance out of competition.

See also
 Canadian records in track and field

References

External links
 
 
 
 
 
 
 

1988 births
Living people
Athletes from Mexico City
Athletes from Vancouver
Olympic track and field athletes of Canada
Canadian male racewalkers
Athletes (track and field) at the 2010 Commonwealth Games
Athletes (track and field) at the 2012 Summer Olympics
Athletes (track and field) at the 2016 Summer Olympics
University of British Columbia alumni
Athletes (track and field) at the 2015 Pan American Games
Pan American Games silver medalists for Canada
World Athletics Championships athletes for Canada
Mexican emigrants to Canada
Pan American Games medalists in athletics (track and field)
Commonwealth Games competitors for Canada
Universiade medalists in athletics (track and field)
Universiade bronze medalists for Canada
Canadian Track and Field Championships winners
Medalists at the 2015 Pan American Games